Hiodon tergisus, the mooneye, is a freshwater fish that is widespread across eastern North America.

Anatomy and appearance
H. tergisus is characterized by its silvery appearance, strongly compressed deep body, and keel that extends from its anal to pelvic fin.

Distribution
Mooneyes are endemic to eastern North America. They can be found as far north as the Hudson Bay and as far south as the Mississippi delta. They have been found as far west as central Alberta, Canada, and as far east as the western edge of North Carolina. Historically, mooneyes have been found in all of the Great Lakes, excluding Lake Superior. Their populations in Lake Michigan and Lake Erie have been declining. Furthermore, their current distribution is becoming more confined to larger rivers, whereas historically they have inhabited much smaller tributaries. The difference between current and historical distributions may be due to the construction of dams that restrict fish from migrating from smaller rivers to large rivers. Factors such as climate change and pollution may also affect their distributions.

Ecology
Mooneyes inhabit clear river and lake environments. They are mostly intolerant of turbid waters and are usually active during the day. As surface feeders, they eat primarily aquatic and terrestrial insects, but they are also known to eat crustaceans, mollusks, and small fish. Young mooneyes tend to feed in more benthic regions, eating immature caddisflies, mayflies, midges, corixids, and plecopterans. Although no predators of adult mooneyes are known, young mooneyes are susceptible to predation by larger piscivorous fish. Two trematode parasites specific to H. tergisus are Crepidostomum hiodontos and Paurorhynchus hiodontis. Researchers believe these parasites are derived from ingested food items. Thus far, no research has been done on how or if these parasites affect populations and ecology of mooneyes.  H. tergisus has latitudinal variation in growth rates in which northern populations mature faster than southern populations. This may be due to less turbidity in the northern latitudes.

Lifecycle
Mooneyes are spring spawners. Since their distribution varies greatly in latitudinal gradient, southern populations spawn much sooner than northern populations, in March and April compared to June and July, respectively. Each spring, adult mooneyes migrate upstream to clearer waters to spawn. Females are capable of producing 10,000-20,000 semibuoyant eggs each year. They prefer clear-running water and solid substrates when spawning. Mooneyes eat larval forms of mayflies, caddisflies, and midges during the first few months after hatching. Females reach sexual maturity at four to five years and males reach sexual maturity at three, and will continue to spawn every year after. Males live up to seven years and females are capable of living up to nine years.

Conservation and management
Currently, H. tergisus is listed as threatened in New York, North Carolina, and Michigan.  Although mooneyes inhabit much of eastern North America, many of their habitats are isolated or discontinuous, so if an isolated population goes extinct or begins to go extinct, no influx of outside mooneyes can take their place. Furthermore, the development of agricultural and industrial practices has led to low water quality.  H. tergisus, along with other pollution-intolerant fish in the Ohio River, have migrated north away from polluted waters over the past 20 years. According to the New York State Department of Environmental Conservation, the decline in population may be due to increased siltation or competition with newly introduced species. Dams are another factor affecting not only mooneye populations, but also a variety of other fish species. Dams are particularly bad due to their ability to block migration routes of mooneyes and other species. Currently, no direct management efforts for H. tergisus are active.

References

Hiodontidae
Fish of North America
Taxa named by Charles Alexandre Lesueur
Fish described in 1818
Freshwater fish of North America